Sillunu Oru Kaadhal is an Indian Tamil-language drama airing on Colors Tamil. It premiered on 4 January 2021 and ended on 28 October 2022 with 562 episodes. The show stars Sameer Ahamathu and Darshini Gowda. The show is an official remake of Marathi TV series Raja Ranichi Ga Jodi airing on Colors Marathi.

Plot 
Kayalvizhi lives with her parents and sisters. One of which is married, but stays in the house along with her husband.

Uthaman, Kayal's father who has lots of debt hanging over his head and this occasionally makes him emotional at times. He took a loan from his friend Sivaraman Zamindar for his elder daughter Gayathri's foreign education, but Sivaraman makes an agreement with Uthaman that after his daughter Gayathri come back from foreign, she has to marry his younger son Surya, who is an IPS Officer.

At that time, Kayal running her own secret business with her friend Moni called "Kalyani Apala Kadai" to help her family financially. Surya caught Kayal while breaking the traffic rules. She lies and tells him that her brother is in hospital. Actually, Surya was on the way to meet her elder sister Gayathri for discussion of marriage. Surya learns that Kayal and Gayathri are sisters and they don't have a brother. Meanwhile, Gayathri loves Saran (her classmate) So she ran out from her home and married him. After some days, Surya and Kayal are compelled to marry under circumstances. Their marriage ends up in a pickle when it is found out that Kayal was not of legal age when she got married. But Kamala, Surya's mother doesn't like Kayal's attitude, otherside also Surya doesn't know about Kayal's secret. Thenu (who is Padma's daughter) joins hands with and create trouble to Surya and revealed Kayal's secret which creates mess and Surya got arrested. Surya is angered as Kayal didn't share her secret to him. After two days, Surya got released and their family members with him and Kayal go to celebrate Ganesha Chathurthi festival and Surya was supposed to be titled as Jr. Jamin. Again, Thenu creates mess behind and made that event cancelled. Kayal finds out a bomb and alerts everyone. Surya also destroys the same. Later Kamala forces Surya to send out Kayal because of past bitterness and that age issue. Since she was adamant, Kayal leaves home with heavy heart and they applied for divorce.

Four Years later
After four years, Kayal is now 21 years old and been seen as trainee in police academy where Surya also in that same academy as a senior official. Surya and Kayal meet again and they got anger because of past bitterness. So, Surya wants to Kayal to be out of that academy. So, he creates some messy things against her.

Cast

Main 
 Darshini Gowda as Kayalvizhi Suryakumar Zamindar a.k.a. Kayal: Surya's Wife, a trainee police officer
 Sameer Ahamathu as DCP Suryakumar Sivaraman Zamindar IPS a.k.a. Surya: an inspiring police officer, Kayal's Husband

Recurring 
 Kammapandi as Uthaman: Kayal's father; Sivaraman Zamindar's friend
 Sri Latha as Kalyani: Uthaman's wife; Kayal's mother
 Sathya Prathyusha as Kavitha: Kayal's eldest sister
 Ranjith as Senthil: Kavitha's husband; Kayal's eldest brother-in-law
 Vidhya Chandran as Monica a.k.a. Moni: Kayal's best friend
 VJ Mohana (2021) → Saira Banu (2021 − 2022) as Gayathri: Kayal's 2nd elder sister; Surya's ex-fiancé; a widow
 Indumathy Manikandan as Kamala Sivaraman Zamindar: Sivaraman Zamindar's second wife; Surya's mother
 Rekha Angelina as Dhanam: Zamindar's well-wisher
 Nathan Shyam as Ranjith Sivaraman Zamindar: Surya's elder brother
 Syamantha Kiran as Rajeswari Ranjith Zamindar a.k.a. Raji: Surya's elder sister-in-law; Ranjith's wife
 Ranjana Nachiyaar as Padma Ravichandran: Sivaraman Zamindar's elder daughter; Kamala's step-daughter; Surya's elder half-sister (Antagonist)
 Adhithri Dinesh (2021 − 2022) as Thenmozhi: Padma's daughter
 Paandi as Ravichandran: Padma's husband
 Praveen (2021 − 2022) as Saran: Gayathri's husband; Kayal's 2nd elder brother-in-law; dead
 Manoj Kumar as Kaali: Surya's arch-rival; Uthaman's friend
 Hari Praz as Rocky: Kaali's younger brother
 S. V. S. Kumar as Kanakkupillai: Zamindar's well-wisher

Cameo appearances 
 Rajesh as Sivaraman Zamindar: Surya's father and Kamala's husband (2021)
 Raghavi as Padma's mother; Sivaraman Zamindar's first wife (2021)
 Singamuthu (2021)
 Sanjana Singh as an anchor (2021)
 DJ Ashwin (2021)
 Abhirami Venkatachalam as Abi - Surya's friend (2021)
 Sona Heiden (2021)
 Anitha Sampath as Kaveri (2021)

Adaptations

References

External links 

Colors Tamil original programming
Tamil-language romance television series
Tamil-language police television series
2021 Tamil-language television series debuts
Tamil-language television shows
2022 Tamil-language television series endings
Tamil-language television series based on Marathi-language television series